Rappahannock Academy is an unincorporated community in Caroline County, Virginia, United States. Rappahannock Academy has a post office with ZIP code 22538. The community was named after the Rappahannock Academy & Military Institute, a now-defunct military academy in the community.

Moss Neck Manor was listed on the National Register of Historic Places in 1999.

References

Unincorporated communities in Caroline County, Virginia
Unincorporated communities in Virginia